There was a nominal total of 180 quota places available for weightlifting at the 2022 Commonwealth Games; 90 each for men and women.

Rules
Each Commonwealth Games Association (CGA) is restricted to one entry per weight category, which equates to a maximum quota of sixteen qualified weightlifters. Those entered may contest one category only.

 As the host CGA, England is guaranteed one quota place in all sixteen weight categories.
 Gold medallists in eligible categories at the 2021 Commonwealth Weightlifting Championships earned one place each.
 Eight or nine places per category are determined by the IWF Commonwealth Ranking List (as of 28 February 2022).
 The last place in each category is determined by a CGF/IWF Bipartite Invitation.

Timeline

Summary

Men's events

55 kg

61 kg

67 kg

73 kg

81 kg

96 kg

109 kg

+109 kg

Women's events

49 kg

55 kg

59 kg

64 kg

71 kg

76 kg

87 kg

+87 kg

Notes

References

Commonwealth Games
Commonwealth Games
Weightlifting at the 2022 Commonwealth Games
Qualification for the 2022 Commonwealth Games